A list of American films released in 1931. 
Cimarron won Best Picture at the Academy Awards.

A-B

C-D

E-F

G-H

I-J

K-L

M-N

O-P

Q-R

S

T

U-Z

See also
 1931 in the United States

References

External links

1931 films at the Internet Movie Database

1931
Films
Lists of 1931 films by country or language